Gino John Marchetti (January 2, 1926 – April 29, 2019) was an American professional football player who was a defensive end and offensive tackle in the National Football League (NFL). He played in 1952 for the Dallas Texans and from 1953 to 1966 for the Baltimore Colts. 

He was inducted into the Pro Football Hall of Fame in 1972. In 1969, Marchetti was named to the National Football League 50th Anniversary All-Time Team. In 1994, Marchetti was named to the National Football League 75th Anniversary All-Time Team. In 2019, he was unanimously named to the NFL 100th Anniversary All-Time Team.

Early years
Marchetti was born in Smithers, West Virginia, the son of Italian immigrants Ernesto and Maria. He enlisted in the U.S. Army after graduating high school in Antioch, California, and fought in the Battle of the Bulge as a machine gunner during World War II. 

Reflecting upon his World War II experience in a 2009 interview, Marchetti called it "life altering" and said "If I had not gone to the Army, what probably would have happened to me is, I would have gone to one of the factories, worked until I was 65, retired, and that would have been my life. That's what they did in Antioch.  Because the war was coming to an end, I could have probably stayed home, graduated [from high school] and never had to go. But it was the best thing I ever did. It gave me the discipline that I needed in my life."

Upon returning home to California after the war, he attended Modesto Junior College for a year before joining the football program at the University of San Francisco, where his team enjoyed an undefeated season in 1951. He was selected in the second round of the 1952 NFL draft (14th overall) by the New York Yanks. In 2004, Marchetti was voted to the East-West Shrine Game Hall of Fame.

Professional football career
During his rookie season, the Yanks became the Dallas Texans, which became the Baltimore Colts in 1953. Marchetti played 13 seasons with the Colts and helped them win NFL Championships in 1958 and 1959. During his career, he was noted for being effective against the run and a relentless pass-rusher.  He was voted "the greatest defensive end in pro football history" by the Pro Football Hall of Fame in 1972.

He moved to left offensive tackle in 1954, a position Marchetti hated, but admitted that it taught him how to beat a blocker. He returned to defensive end in 1955 and made his first Pro Bowl.

He made a big play in the 1958 NFL Championship Game when he prevented the New York Giants from gaining a first down by tackling Frank Gifford just a yard before the first down mark. He fractured his ankle on that same play but, as a team captain, insisted on watching the rest of the historic overtime contest from the sideline with his teammates rather than seeking immediate medical attention in the locker room. The injury forced him to miss the Pro Bowl that year and ended his string of nine consecutive Pro Bowl appearances. Marchetti was First-team All-Pro nine times and a Second-team selection once.

Marchetti's stellar play led to his being called by Sid Gillman, the Los Angeles Rams head coach, "(T)he greatest player in football. It's a waste of time to run around this guy's end. It's a lost play. You don't bother to try it."

His Hall of Fame teammate Art Donovan had this to say about him: "For his first couple of years with the Colts, Gino Marchetti was our enforcer.  Gino was a tough kid from the ghetto.... An Antioch recruiter had spotted the big hulk at the racetrack one day and brought him along to the head coach.  He immediately became a star.  He could also kick some ass, and that particular talent gained him quite a reputation as not only perhaps the greatest defensive end to ever play the game, but also as a dirty, cheap-shot artist.  Then one day Gino was born again, so to speak.  He had just brought down Detroit's marvelous halfback Doak Walker, and he couldn't resist digging the heel of his hand into Walker's schnozz as he was getting up off the ground.  But instead of starting a fight or yelling anything, Walker just looked at him.  Didn't say a word, just stared at Gino.  Gino felt like a piece of shit.  'I could see it in his eyes,' he said later.  'A big guy like me, with probably eighty pounds and six inches on Walker, having to resort to a mean, lowdown trick like that.  That look of disgust reformed me.  I'm no longer the hatchet man around here.'  Which, of course, did not mean that Gino stopped getting his licks in.  Everyone gets their licks in playing football."

He was enshrined in the Bay Area Sports Hall of Fame in 1985.  Also a member of Modesto Junior College Athletic Hall of Fame Class of 1990. He is also a member of the National Italian American Sports Hall of Fame.

Forrest Gregg in an interview: "You ask who was the best ... just my opinion, Marchetti was the best all-around player I ever played against. Great pass rusher. Great against the run. And he never let you rest."

Restaurant
In 1959, Marchetti joined with several of his teammates, including Alan Ameche, and opened a fast food restaurant. The business grew, began to franchise, and would eventually become known as Gino's Hamburgers. It was a successful Mid-Atlantic regional fast-food chain and had 313 company-owned locations when they were sold in 1982 to Marriott International, which abandoned the name in favor of their Roy Rogers restaurants.

In 2009, Marchetti teamed with other former key Gino's employees to resurrect the Gino's name.  Hiring commenced in September 2010 to staff their first new restaurant in the company's old hometown of King of Prussia, Pennsylvania, and Gino's Burgers & Chicken, as the company is now known, opened its first store on October 25, 2010. This restaurant has since closed.  the chain operates restaurants in Glen Burnie, Maryland and Towson, Maryland.

Death
Marchetti died of complications of pneumonia at Paoli Hospital in Paoli, Pennsylvania on April 29, 2019.

Family
Marchetti's grandson Keith Carter was a tight end for UCLA and won a Super Bowl as a coach for the Seattle Seahawks.
Gino was predeceased by son Ernest Marchetti married to Suzanne and granddaughters Ashley and Shauna Marchetti.

Awards and honors
 Pro Bowl Selection (1955–1965)
 All-NFL Selection (1956–1964)
 NFL 50th Anniversary Team (1969)
 Pro Football Hall of Fame (1972)
 Bay Area Sports Hall of Fame (1985)
 NFL 75th Anniversary Team (1994)
 All-Madden All-Millennium Team (2000)
 NFL All-Time Team (2000)
 In 1999, he was ranked number 15 on The Sporting News' list of the 100 Greatest Football Players, the second-highest-ranking defensive end behind Deacon Jones.
 National Italian American Sports Hall of Fame
 NFL 100 Greatest Players (#39) (2010)
 Modesto Junior College Hall Of Fame (1990)

References

External links
 
 

1926 births
2019 deaths
People from Smithers, West Virginia
United States Army personnel of World War II
United States Army soldiers
People from Antioch, California
American people of Italian descent
American football defensive ends
Modesto Pirates football players
San Francisco Dons football players
Sportspeople from the San Francisco Bay Area
Dallas Texans (NFL) players
Baltimore Colts players
Western Conference Pro Bowl players
Pro Football Hall of Fame inductees
Players of American football from West Virginia
Military personnel from West Virginia
Players of American football from California
Deaths from pneumonia in Pennsylvania
National Football League players with retired numbers